Treasure Hunting is a Manhwa series by Kang Gyung-Hyo. The series has sold more than 13 million copies worldwide.

The series introduces South Korean readers to different countries around the world, their history, geography and culture, through the eponymous treasure hunt for a lost, hidden or stolen artifact that is culturally or historically significant to the particular country.

It also mentions any historical ties between South Korea and the country being visited. In translations for different countries, this introduction is changed accordingly for the target readers.

Background 
The primary character of the series is the young but precocious Pang-Yi who accompanied his uncle, the Professor Gu-Bon, on various foreign trips for archaeology or historical studies. They encounter a clue to some legendary lost, and the hunt would take them across the country, bringing them to sights and experiences significant to the country.

Pang-Yi's rival is Do To-ri, a child prodigy, though they are willing to work together occasionally.

Characters

Main Characters

Main Characters

Antagonises Characters

Supporting Characters

World Adventure History

Korean Adventure History

World Civilization Adventure History

Titles

World Adventure History (세계 탐험 시리즈)

Korean Adventure History (한국사 시리즈)

World Civilization Adventure History (세계사 시리즈)

World Cities Adventure History (세계 도시 탐험 시리즈)

References

Manhwa titles
Comics set in South Korea
South Korean manhwa
Archaeology in popular culture